The 1996 Western Athletic Conference men's basketball tournament was held March 6–9 at The Pit at the University of New Mexico in Albuquerque, New Mexico.

Hosts New Mexico upset top-seeded, defending champions Utah in the championship game, 64–60, to clinch their second WAC men's tournament championship.

The Lobos, in turn, received an automatic bid to the 1996 NCAA Division I Tournament. They were joined in the tournament by WAC regular season champions Utah, who received an at-large bid.

Format
No changes were made to the tournament format from the previous year. The top six teams received byes into the quarterfinal round, leaving the lowest four-seeded teams to play in the first round. Teams were seeded based on regular season conference records.

Bracket

References

WAC men's basketball tournament
Tournament
WAC men's basketball tournament
WAC men's basketball tournament